Rosanna Munerotto (born 3 December 1962 in Santa Lucia di Piave) is an Italian long-distance runner who specialized in the marathon race.

Biography
She won three medals, at senior level, at the International athletics competitions. She participated at two editions of the Summer Olympics (1988, 1992). She has 24 caps in national team from 1984 to 1994. She was engaged to 1988 Olympic silver medallist, Salvatore Antibo.

Achievements

National titles
She has won one time the individual national championship.
1 win in the cross country running (1993)

See also
 Italian all-time top lists - 10000 metres
 Italian all-time top lists - Half marathon

References

External links
 

1962 births
Living people
Italian female long-distance runners
Italian female marathon runners
Athletes (track and field) at the 1988 Summer Olympics
Athletes (track and field) at the 1992 Summer Olympics
Olympic athletes of Italy
Mediterranean Games silver medalists for Italy
Athletes (track and field) at the 1987 Mediterranean Games
World Athletics Championships athletes for Italy
Mediterranean Games medalists in athletics